Runyon Rock is a prominent rock along the northern side of Boyd Ridge, in the Crary Mountains, Marie Byrd Land. Mapped by United States Geological Survey (USGS) from surveys and U.S. Navy aerial photographs, 1959–66. Named by Advisory Committee on Antarctic Names (US-ACAN) for William E. Runyon, U.S. Navy, construction electrician at the South Pole Station in 1969 and 1974.

References

 

Rock formations of Marie Byrd Land
Crary Mountains